The Zotye Z300 or Zotye Z360 is a compact sedan produced by Chinese auto maker Zotye Auto.

Overview
The Zotye Z300 was unveiled at the 2012 Beijing Auto Show. Power comes from a Mitsubishi-sourced 1.5 L putting out 120 hp and 143 nm of torque through a 5-speed manual or 5-speed automatic powering the front wheels. 

The Zotye Z300 is available in May 2012, shortly after the launch during the 2012 Beijing Auto Show with prices ranging from 62,900 yuan to 69,900 yuan.

Styling controversies
Styling wise the Zotye Z300 is especially controversial as the exterior design is a complete copy of the Toyota Allion.

2014 facelift
A facelift was conducted in 2014 changing the front and rear DRG design, followed by a name change to Zotye Z360 shortly after.

Export markets
The Zotye Z300 is sold in Iran as the SAIPA Ario, where it is available with a 1.5- or 1.6-liter engines, available in two trim levels: Elegant and TM.

References

External links 

Zotye Z360 official website

Z300
Cars introduced in 2012
2010s cars
Cars of China
Compact cars
Front-wheel-drive vehicles
Sedans